Akash is a term for either space or æther in traditional Indian cosmology.

Akash may also refer to:
 Akash (Jainism)
 Akash (missile)
 Akash, Hama, a Syrian village 
 Cyclone Akash, 2007

People with the given name
 Akash Khurana
 Akash Singh (cricketer, born 2002)
 Akash Singh (cricketer, born 1995)
 Akash Thosar
 Akash Sangwan
 Akash Bhandari
 Akash Dasnayak
 Akash Modi
 Akash Lal
 Akash Parkar
 Akash Vijayvargiya
 Akash Mishra
 Akash Senaratne
 Akash Vukoti
 Akash Deep
 Akash Yadav
 Ahmad Akash
 Akash Malhotra
 Akash Sharma
 Akash Sudan
 Akash Chikte
 Akash Vasisht
 Akash Manoj
 Akash Choudhary
 Akash Pandurang Fundkar
 Akash Verma
 Akash Choolun
 Akash Mandwaal
 Akash Kapur
 Akash Chaurasia
 Akash Vashist
 Akash Antil

People with the surname
 Abu Akash
 Jai Akash
 GMB Akash
 Uttam Akash
 Megha Akash
 Aravind Akash
 Annabathula Akash

See also 
 Akasha (disambiguation)
 Aakash (disambiguation)
 Akashi (disambiguation)